Joseph-Félix Descôteaux (March 17, 1863 – July 13, 1931) was a farmer and political figure in Quebec. He represented Nicolet in the House of Commons of Canada from 1923 to 1930 as a Liberal member.

He was born in Sainte-Monique, Canada East, the son of Félix Descoteaux and Marie-Thérèse Manseau. He was educated at the commercial college in Sainte-Anne d'Yamachiche. Descôteaux was president of the agricultural society for Nicolet County and a director of the Société Coopérative de Québec. He was mayor of Sainte-Monique for six years. Descôteaux was married twice: to Parmélie Manseau in 1892 and Maria Denis in 1901.

References 

Members of the House of Commons of Canada from Quebec
Liberal Party of Canada MPs
Mayors of places in Quebec
1863 births
1931 deaths